Vanestan or Venastan may refer to:
 Vanestan, East Azerbaijan